Alexei Popyrin (born 5 August 1999) is an Australian professional tennis player.

Popyrin has a career-high ATP singles ranking of No. 59 achieved on 8 November 2021. He also has a career-high ATP doubles ranking of No. 235 achieved in June 2022. He turned professional in 2017 and has won one singles title on the ATP Tour.

Personal life
Popyrin was born in Sydney, Australia to Russian parents. He began playing tennis at the Kim Warwick Tennis Academy in Hornsby at the age of four and was in attendance for the historic 2008 Australian Open third round match between Lleyton Hewitt and Marcos Baghdatis. At the age of 8, Popyrin relocated to Dubai for two years due to his father's work commitments before moving to Alicante, Spain where fellow Australian Alex de Minaur was his neighbour. Popyrin also spends time training in Nice, France, Marbella, Spain and Dubai. He has trained at the Mouratoglou Academy since April 2017.

Popyrin is multilingual in English, Russian and Spanish. Popyrin is a supporter of Everton F.C.

Junior career
In 2011, Popyrin won the Australian u12s Grasscourt Championships and, with Chase Ferguson, won the u12s National Claycourt Doubles Championships. In the same year he competed in the Tennis Europe u12 circuit, winning the Stork International 12 & Under in Oetwil Am See (SUI), Torneo U12 - Porto San Giorgio in Porto San Giorgio (ITA), Torneo Citta Di Padova in Padova (ITA). Popyrin lost in Semifinal at Eddie Herr International Junior Tennis Championships - IMG / Bollettieri Sports Academy Bradenton, FL (USA), Passagespoirs Le Passage (FRA), as well as Final of Campionati Internazionali BNL d'Italia U12 - Circolo Canottieri in Roma (ITA).

Popyrin started competing in ITF Junior circuit in 2013 and, in 2017, reached the semifinals at the 2017 Australian Open in the junior doubles tournament. He then followed that up by winning 22 consecutive matches winning 4 consecutive tournaments : the Mediterranee Avenir - Club Olympic Casablancais
Casablanca (MAR), Trofeo Bonfiglio - Tennis Club Milano Milan (ITA), the 2017 French Open junior singles title in May 2017 and his first ITF Professional tournament in Poland F4 Futures Mragowo (POL). While ranked number 2 in the juniors single rankings, Popyrin decided to focus on the professional circuit.

Professional career

2013–2018: Start of pro circuit, First Challenger title, top 150 debut
Popyrin entered his first ITF Futures professional tournament in October 2013 at 14 years of age where he lost a first round qualifying match to Slovakian Martin Beran in Madrid. He secured his first professional qualifying win a year later in another Spanish ITF Futures tournament but failed to qualify for the main draw when he lost in the second round qualifying match. At the beginning of 2016, at the age of 15, Popyrin contested his first ATP Challenger Tour tournament after receiving a wildcard from Tennis Australia to compete in the 2016 Canberra Challenger. He was defeated in the first round by future top 10 player Diego Schwartzman.

In July 2016, he secured his first professional main draw win in an Italian ITF Futures tournament by defeating local talent Tommaso Roggero in straight sets before retiring hurt in the second round. Popyrin continued to play ITF Futures tournaments for the remainder of 2016 and ended the year with a world ranking of No.1155. He won his first professional ITF title in July 2017 at the Poland F4 in Mragowo, Poland. This victory broke Popyrin into the top 1000 for the first time. He played several more ITF and Challenger tournaments for the remainder of 2017 and ended the year with a ranking of 622.

Popyrin started the 2018 season ranked No.622, achieving a career-high ranking 25 times over the course of the season peaking at No.147 in November. In January 2018, he qualified for an ATP World Tour tournament for the first time at the Sydney International beating Nicolas Mahut and Federico Delbonis. He lost in round 1 to John Millman. Later in January, Popyrin made his Grand Slam debut at the 2018 Australian Open after being awarded a wildcard. He lost in round 1 to Tim Smyczek. Popyrin spent the next six months in Europe playing in challenger tournaments, increasing his ranking.

In August 2018, Popyrin qualified for and won hist first Challenger title at the Jinan Challenger in China beating James Ward in the final,  becoming the third youngest teenager in 2018 to win a professional Challenger title. Popyrin continued to perform well and broke into the world's top 200 in late August. In October, Popyrin qualified for his second ATP World Tour main draw at the Stockholm Open, where he again lost to fellow Australian John Millman in round 1. The following week, Popyrin again qualified for a main draw, this time at Swiss Indoors beating Benoit Paire and Mackenzie McDonald. He defeated compatriot Matthew Ebden in round 1 for his first ATP World Tour win. Popyrin ended 2018 with a singles rank of World No. 147.

2019–2020: First Grand Slam win, Top 100 debut
Popyrin commenced 2019 with wildcards into the Brisbane International and Sydney International, losing in the first round in both. He also received a wildcard in the Australian Open, and achieved his first Grand Slam win by defeating Mischa Zverev in straight sets. Popyrin followed this up by beating Dominic Thiem and lost in the third round to Lucas Pouille in closely contested five sets. 

During the first half of 2019 Popyrin qualified for the main draws of the ATP 250 tournaments in New York and Estoril, ATP 500 in Acapulco and Masters 1000 in Indian Wells and Monte Carlo. Following his success on the ATP tour, Popyrin was awarded a main draw wildcard into French Open. In the first round Popyrin defeated France's Ugo Humbert in four sets winning his first Roland Garros men's main draw match. He lost to Laslo Djere in the second round. He broke into ATP top 100 for the first time at World No. 99 on 24 June 2019. 

In July 2019 Popyrin qualified for the main draw of the 2019 Wimbledon Championships  Popyrin lost to Daniil Medvedev in the second round. In the same month, Popyrin received his first direct acceptance into ATP 250 tournament in Atlanta, where he lost in the quarterfinals.

2019 was a breakout year for Popyrin. He played at least second round in all four Grand Slams - 3rd round of Australia Open, 2nd Round of Roland Garros, 2nd Round of Wimbledon and 3rd Round in US Open losing in 4 closely contested sets to Matteo Berrettini 4–6, 4–6, 7–6(3), 6–7(2). 
In 2019 Popyrin qualified for 10 Professional tournaments tying the record set by Mischa Zverev in 2016. 

He ended 2019 with an ATP singles rank of World No. 97.

Popyrin ended 2020 with an ATP singles rank of World No. 113.

2021: First ATP title, top 60 debut
Popyrin received a third wildcard into the main draw of the 2021 Australian Open similar to every year since 2018, with the exception of the 2020 Australian Open where he entered the main draw as direct entry.
In the first round he defeated 13 seed David Goffin after saving four match points 3–6, 6–4, 6–7(4–7), 7–6(8–6), 6–3 in 3 hours 43 minutes. He then lost in the second round to Lloyd Harris.

In February, Popyrin entered the Singapore Open and defeated Marin Čilić in the semifinal and Alexander Bublik in the final to win his first ATP title and achieved a career high singles ranking of 82.

At the 2021 French Open, Popyrin lost to Rafael Nadal in the first round.

At the US Open, Popyrin matched his career-best result, progressing through to the third round, which included a win over Grigor Dimitrov, Popyrin's fourth career top-20 win and third achieved in 2021.

Popyrin ended 2021 with an ATP singles ranking of World No. 61.

2022: Loss of form, second Challenger title, out of top 100
Ranked No. 127 on 9 May 2022, after several exits from early rounds at the start of the year at the 2022 Australian Open (first round), 2022 BNP Paribas Open (first round),  and 2022 Miami (second round), Popyrin gained back his form and clinched the Challenger title at the 2022 BNP Paribas Primrose Bordeaux over Quentin Halys in three sets. Despite this, he fell out of the top 100 again at the end of October.

2023: Fourth Australian Open wildcard & top 10-win, Major third round & back to top 100
Popyrin started his season at the Adelaide International 1. After making it past qualifying, he upset second seed and world No. 6, Félix Auger-Aliassime, in the first round in straight sets. He went on to reach the quarterfinals, where he lost to Yoshihito Nishioka in a tight three-set match. At the Adelaide International 2, he lost in the first round to compatriot and defending champion, Thanasi Kokkinakis. Playing as a wildcard at his home slam, the Australian Open, he stunned eighth seed and world No. 9, Taylor Fritz, in the second round to advance to the third round for the third time at this event. He ended up losing in the third round to American rising star Ben Shelton. As a result, his ranking moved back into the top 100 from No. 113 to No. 90.

In February, Popyrin competed at the Bahrain Ministry of Interior Challenger in 	Manama, Bahrain. Seeded second, he made it to the quarterfinals where he lost to eighth seed and eventual champion, Thanasi Kokkinakis. In Dubai, he was defeated in the first round by qualifier Pavel Kotov.

In March at the 2023 BNP Paribas Open he lost in the second round to Hubert Hurkacz after he entered the tournament as lucky loser and won against another qualifier Zhizhen Zhang in the first round.

National representation

Davis Cup
Popyrin made his Davis Cup debut for Australia in February 2019, at the age of 19, winning his first rubber against Bosnia and Herzegovina in Adelaide.

ATP career finals

Singles: 1 (1 title)

Performance timeline

Singles
Current through the 2023 Australian Open.

Doubles 
Current through the 2022 Atlanta Open.

Record against top 10 players

Popyrin's record against players who have been ranked in the top 10, with those who are active in boldface. Only ATP Tour main draw matches are considered:

Record against players ranked No. 11–20
Active players are in boldface. 

  Feliciano López 1–1
 Nikoloz Basilashvili 1–0
 Alex de Minaur 1–1
 Reilly Opelka 1–0 
*

Top 10 wins
He has a  record against players who were, at the time the match was played, ranked in the top 10.

:* '''

ATP Challenger and ITF Futures finals

Singles: 4 (3 titles, 1 runner-up)

Junior Grand Slam finals

Boys' Singles: 1 (1 title)

References

External links
 
 
 

1999 births
Living people
Australian male tennis players
Tennis players from Sydney
Australian people of Russian descent
French Open junior champions
Grand Slam (tennis) champions in boys' singles